The Colorado Springs Labor Day Lift Off (formerly the Colorado Balloon Classic) is a hot air balloon festival in Colorado Springs. Held each Labor Day weekend since 1977, it takes place near Prospect Lake in Memorial Park. It is the "largest and the longest continuously running hot air balloon festival in the Rocky Mountain region as well as the State of Colorado."

The 2016 show in September 2016 marked its fortieth anniversary.

Gallery

References

External links
 Colorado Springs Labor Day Lift Off (official site)
 Memorial Park map

Culture of Colorado Springs, Colorado
Tourist attractions in Colorado Springs, Colorado
Hot air balloon festivals in the United States
Festivals in Colorado
Events in Colorado Springs, Colorado